Time Apart: A History of Hope is a 2008 documentary film by Rachel Bower and Warren Brown.  Principal photography was done in Romania, Israel and Ukraine. The film received press coverage by Breakfast Television, CBC Radio, CTV News, and The Chronicle Herald newspaper.

Synopsis
A search, a journey, a life's dream fulfilled. Seventy-seven-year-old Holocaust survivor Alice Zuckerman never gave up hope she would find her family, lost after the Second World War. When scribbled notes on torn paper reveal clues to her past, Alice and her family reunite. Alice takes us on a moving journey through old Eastern Europe, a world that seemingly disappeared through Nazism and communism. Yet the world of Alice's childhood remains vital in the hearts of the people she meets along the way.

The documentary runs 43 minutes, and is produced by Willow Productions.

Film festivals
Time Apart: A History of Hope was an official selection in the following film festivals:

 Big Bear Lake Film Festival, Big Bear Lake, CA September 2010 
 DocMiami Miami, Miami, FL May 2010 
 Atlantic Film Festival, Halifax, NS September 2009 
 Lighthouse Film Festival, Long Beach Island, NJ June 2009 
 SilverWave Film Festival, Fredericton, NB November 2008
 New Hope Film Festival, New Hope, PA, July 2011

The film has also been screened at:
 Holocaust Education Week, Toronto, ON November 2009 
 Holocaust Education Week, Halifax, NS November 2008

Awards
The film won the New Brunswick Joy Award through Linda Joy Award at the Atlantic Film Festival in Halifax, N.S.

References

External links

2008 films
Canadian documentary films
2008 documentary films
Documentary films about the Holocaust
2000s Canadian films